Cryptandra aridicola is a flowering plant in the family Rhamnaceae and is endemic to inland areas of Western Australia. It is a small, spreading shrub with white or pink flowers.

Description
The young stems are thickly covered initially with white, matted hairs but soon becoming smooth. Flowering occurs from July to September and the dry fruit is moderately or thickly hairy.

Taxonomy and naming
Cryptandra aridicola was first formally described in 1995 by Barbara Lynette Rye and the description was published in the journal Nuytsia. The specific epithet (aridicola ) means "arid inhabitant".

Distribution and habitat
This cryptandra grows in sandy location over limestone or granite on stoney ridges, hills and plains in the Coolgardie, Great Victoria Desert and Murchison bioregions of inland Western Australia.

References

aridicola
Rosales of Australia
Flora of Western Australia